Yerko Bastián Leiva Lazo (born 14 June 1998) is a Chilean professional footballer who plays as a midfielder for Curicó Unido on loan from Necaxa.

Career statistics

Club

External links
 Profile at Universidad de Chile
 
 

1998 births
Living people
People from Puente Alto
Chilean footballers
Chilean expatriate footballers
Chile international footballers
Chile youth international footballers
Chile under-20 international footballers
Footballers from Santiago
Universidad de Chile footballers
Unión La Calera footballers
Club Necaxa footballers
Curicó Unido footballers
Chilean Primera División players
Liga MX players
Chilean expatriate sportspeople in Mexico
Expatriate footballers in Mexico
Association football midfielders